Cesar Alex Pachà Romero (born 1 November 1975) is a Chilean-Swedish former footballer.

Honours

Club
AIK
Svenska Cupen: 1996–97

References

External links
Profile at AIK

Living people
1975 births
Allsvenskan players
Veikkausliiga players
Swedish people of Chilean descent
Sweden under-21 international footballers
Sweden youth international footballers
AIK Fotboll players
Hammarby Fotboll players
FC Lahti players
Kuopion Palloseura players
Swedish footballers
Sundbybergs IK players
Swedish expatriate footballers
Expatriate footballers in Finland
Association football forwards